Shabbir Ahmed Khan (born 21 April 1976) is a Pakistani former cricketer who played for the Pakistani national cricket team between 2003 and 2007 before got banned for an illegal bowling action. 

He was a line-and-length pace bowler who took eight wickets for 109 runs on his Test debut against Bangladesh in the first of their 2003–04 three-Test series, including five wickets in the second innings. He also had an impressive start to his One-Day International career after picking up three wickets (all three bowled out) with two wickets in his first over, in his debut against the West Indies at Toronto.

Style
Shabbir Ahmed is a tall (6'5"), Pakistani fast bowler. He extracts a great deal of bounce, even on lifeless wickets, and bowling from close to the stumps – much like Glenn McGrath – allows him to stick to a tight wicket-to-wicket line. He seams and cuts more than he swings, often sharply and both ways and is a sound exponent of reverse swing.

One year ban
Shabbir had taken 51 wickets in 10 tests, when in 2005 after playing the first Test against England he was reported to the ICC for an illegal bowling action. Following an investigation into his action, Ahmed was banned from cricket for one year in December 2005.

Return to cricket
As of 21 December 2006, having completed his one-year term, Shabbir was once again eligible to play International Cricket. However, the clause was that if Shabbir was reported again, he would be suspended from bowling at international level until his action is reassessed.

Shabbir played in the Pakistani domestic competition till 2013 after which he called it quits.

See also
 List of Pakistan cricketers who have taken five-wicket hauls on Test debut

References

1976 births
Living people
Bahawalpur cricketers
Gloucestershire cricketers
Multan cricketers
National Bank of Pakistan cricketers
Pakistan One Day International cricketers
Pakistan Test cricketers
Pakistan Twenty20 International cricketers
Water and Power Development Authority cricketers
Cricketers who have taken five wickets on Test debut
Cricketers from Khanewal
Pakistani cricketers
Redco Pakistan Limited cricketers
United Bank Limited cricketers
Chennai Superstars cricketers
ICL Pakistan XI cricketers